Robbie Harris (born 30 March 1982 in Durban, South Africa) is a rugby union prop, currently playing for KwaZulu-Natal club side Durban Collegians.

References

External links 
 Sharks profile

1982 births
Living people
Leicester Tigers players
Rugby union players from Durban
Rugby union props
Sharks (Currie Cup) players
South African people of British descent
South African rugby union players